The 1965 Gossage Cup was the 37th edition of the Gossage Cup, an international football competition competed by the teams of CECAFA. It was hosted by Uganda, and won by Tanzania. It was played between September 25 and October 2.

Participants 
Four nations competed.

Group

Matches

References
International-Football.net
RSSSF.com
CECAFA Cup